Café Rouge is a French-styled restaurant chain, with 30 sites across the United Kingdom. Café Rouge is part of a bigger restaurant network owned by Casual Dining Group.

History
Café Rouge was founded by Roger Myers and Karen Jones, in Richmond, London as a small restaurant chain in 1989. As the brand grew, Myers and Jones incorporated the chain into a larger restaurant group: the Pelican Group. In July 1996, Whitbread purchased Pelican Group – comprising 110 restaurants under the Dôme, Mamma Amalfi and, primarily, Café Rouge brands – for £133m. 

The restaurant chain gained much exposure after frequently being mentioned in the 1996 novel Bridget Jones's Diary, with the main character Bridget Jones (and her friends) visiting her local branch of the restaurant regularly throughout the novel.

In May 2002, Whitbread sold Pelican to Tragus Group (later renamed Casual Dining Group) in a management buy-in for £25m.

In 2009, Café Rouge began a partnership with the Gourmet Society, offering their members discounts on production of a Gourmet Society restaurant discount card.

In February 2011, Café Rouge introduced a new fast-service format to the brand. Café Rouge Express at Euston railway station and Southampton's WestQuay shopping centre, aims to reduce customer waiting time and the reduced menu range is available to eat in or take away.

In 2012, it was reported that Café Rouge intended investing in excess of £20m refurbishing its restaurants over the next few years, starting with the Hampstead branch. Created by Afroditi Krassa, the new design is inspired by classic but urban Parisian bistros, whilst remaining sensitive to the essence of the original Café Rouge. The design will be rolled out across 125 restaurants within three years, with interiors tailored to each site.

In September 2012, Café Rouge joined the Nectar loyalty card reward scheme as a redemption partner.

In light of the impact of the COVID-19 pandemic, in May 2020 Café Rouge's owner Casual Dining Group announced that it was working with advisors on next steps for the overall business as a prudent measure to protect the company whilst planning for the future and as part of that process had filed a Notice of Intention to appoint administrators. On 2 July 2020 the company entered administration, with 32 branches of Café Rouge set to close.

Charity

In 2013, Café Rouge were official partners of Comic Relief, the British charity founded in 1985 that aims to "bring about positive and lasting change in the lives of poor and disadvantaged people."

Tipping and minimum wage
In 2008 the company was reported as paying staff less than the legal minimum wage, relying on tips to make up the difference. This led to a campaign in Parliament to make this practice illegal.

In 2009 the company was found to be threatening to dismiss waiting staff who do not get customers to pay tips on credit cards rather than in cash. Credit card tips were used by the company to subsidise wages (which are usually the legal minimum) whereas cash tips go directly to waiting staff. In line with changes to tipping legislation, which came into effect on 1 October 2009, Café Rouge reviewed and updated its policies to ensure that all tips, after a 10% deduction for administrative and other costs paid by credit or debit card, were distributed through the payroll system to restaurant staff. This was done via a tronc system. In 2015, Café Rouge amended its policy to ensure all employees are permitted to keep all tips and service charges paid in cash and are free to share their tips with colleagues if they so wish. Their employees are required to declare the income generated from cash tips to HM Revenue & Customs for tax purposes. When tips or service charges are paid for by credit card or debit card, the restaurant does take a 2.5% administration charge to cover administration and bank fees before distributing the remainder in full to employees. Employees retain any tips in addition to their pay at the rate of or above National Minimum Wage.

Environmental record
In November 2015 the chain was one of seven restaurants surveyed that failed to meet a basic level of sustainability in its seafood. After working closely with the Marine Stewardship Council (MSC), Café Rouge topped Fish2Fork's analysis of fish sourcing policies across high street restaurants in 2017, and subsequently received MSC's official Blue Fish Ecolabel accreditation in March 2018.

See also
 Bella Italia
 Strada
 Belgo
 Casual Dining Group

References

External links

 
 Casual Dining Group

British companies established in 1989
Companies that have entered administration in the United Kingdom
French restaurants in the United Kingdom
Restaurants established in 1989